Yang Ren (Chinese: 楊任; Pinyin: Yáng Rèn) is a character from the classic Chinese novel Fengshen Yanyi.

Yang Ren is a high-ranking official within the Shang Dynasty and has the title of Grand Counselor. Once the Jiang Ziya "suicide" incident was at a close, Yang Ren would investigate. Once a messenger headed to Chong Houhu explained the entire situation to Yang Ren, Yang Ren would discuss the issue with King Zhou. As usual, King Zhou grew exceedingly angry over Yang Ren's logic and immediately demanded his eyes be gouged out as punishment. Once this process was performed, Yang Ren would lie on the ground in utter shock covered in his own blood.

To save Yang Ren from any further bloodshed, Superiorman Insouciant of Mount Green Top Purple Cave would rescue him with his Yellow Kerchiefed Genie. While Yang Ren was being held in the superiorman's arms, he blew on Yang Ren's eye sockets and effectively awakened him with a pair of hands that had eyes within the palm (rather than a pair of eyes itself). The superiorman said that Yang Ren's time was not over as allotted under the will of heaven and thus he remained as a disciple of Insouciant for the remainder of his time.

Yang Ren was appointed as the deity of Jiazi Taisui Shen (甲子太歲之神) in the end.

Notes

References
 Investiture of the Gods Chapter 18 pages 209 - 211

Chinese gods
Investiture of the Gods characters